Maria Mose Vestergaard (born 21 May 1995) is a Danish handball player for HH Elite.

Achievements
Danish League:
Winner: 2016, 2019
Silver Medalist: 2015  
Bronze Medalist: 2017  
EHF Cup:
Finalist: 2014

References

1995 births
Living people
People from Esbjerg
Danish female handball players
Viborg HK players
Sportspeople from the Region of Southern Denmark